José Oscar Bernardi (born 20 June 1954), known as Oscar, is a Brazilian former association footballer who played as a defender.

He notably represented the Brazil national football team at international level, and played as a starter in defence at the 1978 and 1982 FIFA World Cups, while he was a reserve in 1986. He was capped almost 60 times for Brazil between April 1978 and May 1986, and scored two goals. At club level, he played for São Paulo and Ponte Preta in Brazil.

Oscar also played for American side New York Cosmos in 1980 and Japanese team Nissan FC between 1987 and 1989. After his professional retirement, he coached several football clubs in Japan and Brazil. He now runs an athletic training center in Monte Sião, Minas Gerais. Oscar Bernardi founded a football club, named Brasilis Futebol Clube, in 2007.

Personal life
Bernardi is Roman Catholic and has Italian roots due to his family.

Career statistics

Club

International

Managerial statistics

Honours

Club
Campeonato Paulista: 1980, 1981, 1985, 1987
Campeonato Brasileiro Série A: 1986
Japan Soccer League Division 1: 1988–89, 1989–90

Individual
 Brazilian Silver Ball: 1977

References

External links
 
 Oscar Bernardi Soccer Management
 New York Cosmos stats
 

1954 births
Living people
Brazilian Roman Catholics
Brazilian footballers
Brazilian expatriate footballers
Brazilian people of Italian descent
Campeonato Brasileiro Série A players
Associação Atlética Ponte Preta players
São Paulo FC players
North American Soccer League (1968–1984) players
New York Cosmos players
Japan Soccer League players
Yokohama F. Marinos players
Brazilian football managers
Ittihad FC managers
J1 League managers
Kyoto Sanga FC managers
1978 FIFA World Cup players
1982 FIFA World Cup players
1986 FIFA World Cup players
Brazilian expatriate sportspeople in the United States
Expatriate soccer players in the United States
Expatriate footballers in Japan
Expatriate football managers in Japan
Expatriate football managers in Saudi Arabia
Brazil international footballers
Al Hilal SFC managers
Cruzeiro Esporte Clube managers
Al Shabab FC (Riyadh) managers
Association football defenders